Euryentmema is a genus of sea snails, marine gastropod mollusks in the family Mangeliidae.

Species
Species within the genus Euryentmema include:
 Euryentmema australiana T. Shuto, 1983
 † Euryentmema cigclis W.P. Woodring 1928

References

External links
   Bouchet P., Kantor Yu.I., Sysoev A. & Puillandre N. (2011) A new operational classification of the Conoidea. Journal of Molluscan Studies 77: 273-308
 Worldwide Mollusc Species Data Base: Mangeliidae
  Global Names Index : Euryentmema